Algimantas Antanovich Mackevičius (born 28 May 1958) is a Lithuanian former footballer who is last known to have played as a midfielder for Jagiellonia Białystok.

Career

Mackevičius started his career with Soviet third tier side Žalgiris, helping them earn promotion to the Soviet top flight and achieve 3rd place. In 1989, Mackevičius signed for Jagiellonia Białystok in the Polish top flight, where he made 5 league appearances and scored 0 goals but left due to injury and financial problems. On 29 July 1989, he debuted for Jagiellonia Białystok during a 1-1 draw with Zagłębie Sosnowiec.

References

External links

 

Lithuanian expatriate footballers
Lithuanian expatriate sportspeople in Poland
Living people
1958 births
Ekstraklasa players
FK Žalgiris players
Jagiellonia Białystok players
FK Atlantas players
Soviet Top League players
Soviet First League players
Soviet Second League players
Expatriate footballers in Poland
Association football midfielders
Lithuanian footballers
Sportspeople from Vilnius